The 1937 New South Wales Rugby Football League premiership was the 30th season of the Sydney, New South Wales-based top-grade rugby league club competition, Australia's first. Nine teams from across the city contested the premiership during the season, which lasted from April until June, with Eastern Suburbs being crowned champions.

Season summary
The 1937 season only lasted eight rounds due to the Kangaroo tour, and used a “first past the post” system to determine the premiers. There were no Finals. The second half of what would normally have been the NSWRFL season was taken up with a City Cup competition.

Eastern Suburbs won their seventh Premiership going through the season undefeated – a feat achieved by teams in only five other seasons before or since. Having won only two matches in four seasons and only fifteen (plus two draws) in the nine seasons since 1929, the University club withdrew voluntarily from the premiership at the end of the season.

Teams
1937 proved University’s final NSWRFL season. After being allowed one more season to prove themselves, the Students did not win a match in any grade, scoring only 41 points in first grade, 39 in reserves, and 21 in third grade – in which University veterans were allowed to play the second half of the last match as a farewell.
 Balmain, formed on January 23, 1908, at Balmain Town Hall
 Canterbury-Bankstown
 Eastern Suburbs, formed on January 24, 1908, at Paddington Town Hall
 Newtown, formed on January 14, 1908
 North Sydney, formed on February 7, 1908
 South Sydney, formed on January 17, 1908, at Redfern Town Hall
 St. George, formed on November 8, 1920, at Kogarah School of Arts
 University, formed in 1919 at Sydney University
 Western Suburbs, formed on February 4, 1908

Ladder

References

External links
 Rugby League Tables - Notes AFL Tables
 Rugby League Tables - Season 1937 AFL Tables
 Premiership History and Statistics RL1908
 Results: 1931-40 at rabbitohs.com.au

New South Wales Rugby League premiership
Nswrfl season